Jacques Bernard Hombron (1798–1852) was a French naval surgeon and naturalist.

Hombron served on the French voyage of the Astrolabe and Zélée between 1837 and 1840 to investigate the perimeter of Antarctica. He described a number of plants and animals with Honoré Jacquinot. Hombron served as surgeon and botanist on the Astrolabe and Honoré Jacquinot was a junior surgeon on the Zélée. A botanical account of the expedition was published in: "Voyage au Pôle Sud et dans l'Océanie sur les corvettes l'Astrolabe et la Zélée ... Botanique / par MM. Hombron et Jacquinot"; (2 volumes 1845–1853).

In 1847 Hombron published a two-volume work on his personal and other explorers' adventures, titled: "Aventures les plus curieuses des voyageurs : coup d'oeil autour du monde". In 1841 Charles Gaudichaud-Beaupré named the plant genus Hombronia in his honor.

See also
 European and American voyages of scientific exploration

References 
 IPNI List of plants described and co-described by Hombron

1798 births
1852 deaths
French surgeons
French naturalists
19th-century French botanists
French ornithologists
Naval surgeons